Bristol is an unincorporated community in Prowers County, Colorado, United States. The U.S. Post Office at Holly (ZIP Code 81047) now serves Bristol postal addresses.

History
The town of Bristol was established in 1906. The community was named after C. H. Bristol, a railroad official. The Bristol Post Office opened on July 1, 1908, and closed on November 2, 1997.

Geography
Bristol is located at  (38.122134,-102.311211).

See also

References

External links

Unincorporated communities in Prowers County, Colorado
Unincorporated communities in Colorado